Pandora is a genus of small saltwater clams, marine bivalves in the family Pandoridae.

Species
 Pandora albida (Röding, 1798)
 Pandora arenosa Conrad, 1834
 Pandora aversa (Hedley, 1913)
 Pandora bilirata Conrad, 1855
 Pandora braziliensis G. B. Sowerby II, 1874
 Pandora brevifrons G. B. Sowerby I, 1835
 Pandora brevirostris Güller & Zelaya, 2016
 Pandora bushiana Dall, 1886
 Pandora carinata (Prashad, 1932)
 Pandora cumingii Hanley, 1861
 Pandora dissimilis G. B. Sowerby III, 1894
 Pandora filosa (Carpenter, 1864)
 Pandora flexuosa G. B. Sowerby I, 1822
 Pandora glacialis Leach, 1819
 Pandora gorii Rolán & Hernández, 2007
 Pandora gouldiana Dall, 1886
 Pandora granulata (Dall, 1915)
 Pandora inaequivalvis (Linnaeus, 1758)
 Pandora inflata Boss and Merrill, 1965
 Pandora inornata A. E. Verrill and Bush, 1898
 Pandora oblonga G. B. Sowerby I, 1830
 Pandora otukai Habe, 1952
 Pandora patula (Tate, 1889)
 Pandora perangusta Preston, 1910
 Pandora pinna (Montagu, 1803)
 Pandora pulchella Yokoyama, 1926
 Pandora rachaelae Valentich-Scott & Skoglund, 2010
 Pandora radiata Sowerby, 1835
 Pandora sarahae Valentich-Scott & Skoglund, 2010
 Pandora sicula Lamy, 1934
 Pandora similis G. B. Sowerby III, 1897
 Pandora sinica F.-S. Xu, 1992
 Pandora trilineata Say, 1822
 Pandora uncifera Pilsbry & H. N. Lowe, 1932
 Pandora wardiana A. Adams, 1859

Synonyms
 Pandora cornuta C. B. Adams, 1852: synonym of Clidiophora cornuta (C. B. Adams, 1852) (original combination)
 Pandora forresterensis Willett, 1918: synonym of Pandora wardiana A. Adams, 1860
 Pandora grandis Dall, 1877: synonym of Pandora wardiana A. Adams, 1860
 Pandora punctata Conrad, 1837: synonym of Heteroclidus punctatus (Conrad, 1837) (original combination)

References

External links
 
 Bruguière J.G. (1789-1792). Encyclopédie méthodique ou par ordre de matières. Histoire naturelle des vers, volume 1. Paris: Pancoucke. Pp. i-xviii, 1-344
  Röding, P.F. (1798). Museum Boltenianum sive Catalogus cimeliorum e tribus regnis naturæ quæ olim collegerat Joa. Fried Bolten, M. D. p. d. per XL. annos proto physicus Hamburgensis. Pars secunda continens Conchylia sive Testacea univalvia, bivalvia & multivalvia. Trapp, Hamburg. viii, 199 pp.
 Brown, T. (1827). Illustrations of the conchology of Great Britain and Ireland. Drawn from nature. W.H. Lizars and D. Lizars, Edinburgh and S. Highley, London. 144 pp., 52 pls
 Fischer, P. (1880-1887). Manuel de conchyliologie et de paléontologie conchyliologique, ou histoire naturelle des mollusques vivants et fossiles suivi d'un Appendice sur les Brachiopodes par D. P. Oehlert. Avec 23 planches contenant 600 figures dessinées par S. P. Woodward.. Paris: F. Savy. Published in 11 parts (fascicules), xxiv + 1369 pp., 23 pls.
 [s://www.biodiversitylibrary.org/item/98240 Dall, W. H. (1890-1903). Contributions to the Tertiary fauna of Florida with especial reference to the Miocene silex-beds of Tampa and the Pliocene beds of the Caloosahatchie River. Transactions of the Wagner Free Institute of Science. 3(1)]
 Dall, W. H. (1915). A review of some bivalve shells of the group Anatinacea from the west coast of America. Proceedings of the United States National Museum. 49 (2116): 441–456

 
Bivalve genera